James L. McCusker (b. abt. 1869) was an American swimmer known for his high-profile swims against top competitors in the 1890s and early 1900s.James L. McCusker - Champion Long Distance Swimmer , everett.ma.us, Retrieved 31 July 2013)  

McCusker was born in Ireland and emigrated to the United States, living in Everett, Massachusetts.   After winning a three-man September 1891 swimming race at Lake Quinsigamond against John Leavitt and Robert Magree for a prize of $750, he was declared the American champion.(5 November 1891). McCusker is Champion, The Wichita Daily Eagle, p. 7, col. 4(15 September 1891). A Swimming Match, The Wichita Daily Eagle, p. 2, col. 1 (report of September 14, 1891 race on Lake Quinsigamond between McCusker, Robert P. Magee, and John Leavitt)  He then proceeded to travel to challenge other top swimmers to matches, including James Finney, Joseph Nuttall in England in 1893 and Boston in 1904 and Australian Percy Cavill.(2 October 1900). The Sporting World, Aurora Daily Express

After failing in an attempt to cross the English Channel in 1907, by 1908 McCusker fell on hard times, and was sent to the Massachusetts state mental hospital for two years related to theft charges.

References

American male swimmers
1869 births
Year of death missing